Nooxobeia is an extinct genus of dissorophid temnospondyl from the Early Permian (Guadalupian) of Oklahoma. The generic name is derived from the Arapaho (a language spoken in the type locality of the holotype) word nooxobe, which means frog.

Taxonomy
Olson (1972) referred a complete dissorophid specimen (UCLA VP 3066) from the Chickasha Formation of Oklahoma to Fayella chickashaensis based on cranial similarities to the holotype. However, in 2018, Gee, Scott and Reisz declared Fayella a nomen dubium and an indeterminate temnospondyl, and made UCLA VP 3066 the holotype of the new species Nooxobeia gracilis.

See also

 Prehistoric amphibian
 List of prehistoric amphibians

References

Dissorophids
Cisuralian temnospondyls of North America
Fossil taxa described in 2018
Prehistoric amphibian genera